This is a list of Kannada language films produced in the Kannada film industry in India in 2014.
 Films are generally released every Friday or Festival Day.
 In addition films can be released on specific festival days.

Events
 61st National Film Awards
 Karnataka State Film Awards 
 61st Filmfare Awards South
 3rd South Indian International Movie Awards (3rd SIIMA)
 Suvarna Film Awards, by Suvarna channel.
 Udaya Film Awards, by Udaya Channel
 Bangalore International Film Festival
 2nd Kannada international Music Awards (2nd KiMA) 
 Bangalore Times Film Awards

Scheduled releases

January —June

July — December

Notable deaths

References

External links
 Kannada Movies of 2014 at Internet Movie Database

Lists of 2014 films by country or language
2014
2014 in Indian cinema